Air Commodore Charles Henry Clarke,  (25 November 1923 – 7 May 2019) was a British Royal Air Force officer. Having served in Bomber Command in the Second World War, he was shot down and interned at Stalag Luft III—this was The Great Escape camp and he acted as a watcher but was not involved in the escape itself. He remained in the RAF after the war, commanded RAF Stafford, served in Palestine, Aden and Malta, before retiring in 1978. He later campaigned for a memorial to Bomber Command: one was finally erected in 2012 in London.

Early life and education
Clarke was born on 25 November 1923 in the Old Street area of Tottenham, London, England. He was the eldest of three children of Thomas Clarke, who had fought in the Machine Gun Corps in the First World War, and Elizabeth. He was educated at Down Lane Central School in Tottenham. He left school at the age of 17.

RAF career

Second World War

In 1941, Clarke joined the Royal Air Force. Serving in the other ranks, he rose to leading aircraftman. On 1 March 1943, he was commissioned into the Royal Air Force Volunteer Reserve as a pilot officer on probation (emergency commission). He was posted to No. 619 Squadron, where he served as a bomb aimer on the squadron's Lancasters. He completed 18 missions before being shot down on his 19th.

On 25 February 1944, while on a bombing mission to Germany, Clarke was shot down over the Black Forest. He and three others parachuted from the plane; the three other crew members died in the crash. He was captured by the Germans, and eventually taken to Stalag Luft III: he arrived at the prisoner of war camp weeks before The Great Escape of 24/25 March 1944. Clarke acted as a watcher to those digging the tunnels (warning them of any nearing guards) and as a forger (creating papers for the escapees). He did not take part in the escape itself, and remained in the camp until a forced march in January 1945 (the "Long March") took him and the remaining prisoners to a new camp near Lübeck. He was promoted to a war substantive flight lieutenant on 1 March 1945. He was liberated by British forces in April 1945. In later life, he helped build a replica of Hut 104 (the start of The Great Escape tunnel) at Stalag Luft III, and would return each anniversary to Poland to retrace the steps he took on the "Long March".

Post-war service

On 1 January 1947, Clarke transferred to the equipment branch as a flying officer with seniority on that rank from 1 March 1945. He was promoted to flight lieutenant on 25 February 1948. He was granted a permanent commission on 1 April 1952, thereby allowing him to serve in the RAF until retirement. As part of the half-yearly promotions, he was promoted to squadron leader on 1 January 1953, to wing commander on 1 July 1961, and to group captain on 1 January 1967. 

In addition to his Second World War service, he undertook a number of overseas postings. He served in Palestine during the 1947–1949 Palestine war, in Aden during the Aden Emergency and the British withdrawal in 1967, and in Malta. From 1967 to 1970, he was officer commanding RAF Stafford. He also had desk jobs at the Ministry of Aircraft Production, the Air Ministry, and at the Ministry of Defence.

Clarke retired from the Royal Air Force in November 1978, with the rank of air commodore.

Later life

After retiring from the RAF, Clarke moved into business, including working as a director of the department store Debenhams. He maintained his links with the RAF through serving as President and Chair of the Royal Air Forces Ex-POW Association and as Chair of the Bomber Command Association. He was a leading figure in the campaign for a memorial to Bomber Command: one was eventually erected in 2012 in London's Green Park.

In the 2007 New Year Honours, he was appointed Officer of the Order of the British Empire (OBE) "For services to the Royal Air Forces Ex-Prisoners of War Association".

Personal life
Clarke met his wife, Eileen (née Fosh), at a war-time dance. They married in November 1946, following his return from the war. Together they had a daughter, Naida: she is a former merchant banker who married Sir Gordon Duff.

Clarke died on 7 May 2019, aged 95.

References

External links
 Clarke speaking to the BBC about The Great Escape
 International Bomber Command Centre Digital Archive: interviews and image

1923 births
2019 deaths
British military personnel of the Aden Emergency
British military personnel of the Palestine Emergency
British World War II prisoners of war
Officers of the Order of the British Empire
People from Tottenham
Royal Air Force air commodores
Royal Air Force personnel of World War II
Royal Air Force Volunteer Reserve personnel of World War II
Stalag Luft III prisoners of World War II
Survivors of aviation accidents or incidents
Military personnel from London